The Umbrian regional election of 1995 took place on 23 April 1995.

For the first time the President of the Region was directly elected by the people, although the election was not yet binding and the President-elect could have been replaced during the term.

Bruno Bracalente (Democratic Party of the Left) was elected President of the Region, defeating Riccardo Pongelli (Forza Italia) by a landslide.

Results

Source: Ministry of the Interior

Elections in Umbria
1995 elections in Italy